Valle Grande is a village and the capital of the eponymous Valle Grande Department of Jujuy Province, Argentina.

References 

Populated places in Jujuy Province